, or  for short, is a shōjo manga magazine published monthly in Japan by Shueisha since 1964.

Serializations

Current
Fujishiro-san Kei – Yuki Nojin
My Special One – Momoko Kōda
Sakura, Saku – Io Sakisaka
Shitsuji no Ojou-sama – Mari Mimura
Vampire – Riya Sakurai
Yururi Yururi – Anna Tsuji

Past

1964–1979
 Choushoujo Asuka (1975-2002)
 Igano Kabamaru (1979–1981)

1980–1989

 Hot Road (1986–1987) by Taku Tsumugi
 Mabataki mo Sezu (1987–1990) by Taku Tsumugi

1990–1999

 Itazura na Kiss (1990–1999)
 Sensei! (1996–2003)
 Barairo no Ashita (1997–1999)
 The Devil Does Exist (1999–2002)

2000–2009

 Love Com (2001–2006)
 High School Debut (2003–2008)
 Crimson Hero (2003–2011)
 Cat Street (2004–2007)
 B.O.D.Y. (2004–2008)
 Yasuko to Kenji (2005–2006)
 Kimi ni Todoke (2006–2017)
 Dreamin' Sun (2007–2011)
 Strobe Edge (2007–2010)
 Aozora Yell (2008–2015)
 Berry Dynamite (2009–2010)

2010–2019

 No Longer Heroine (2010–2013)
 Ao Haru Ride (2011–2015)
 My Love Story!! (2011–2016)
 Wolf Girl and Black Prince (2011–2016)
 Rainbow Days (2012–2017)
 Orange (2012–2017)
 Honey So Sweet (2012–2015)
 ReRe Hello (2013–2016)
 Sono Omokage o Shitteru (2013)
 Sensei Kunshu (2013–2017)
 Machida-kun no Sekai (2015–2018)
 Love Me, Love Me Not (2015–2019)
 Suteki na Kareshi (2016–2020)
My Love Mix-Up! (2019–2022)
Ima Koi: Now I'm in Love (2019–2023)

References

External links
Official site 

1964 establishments in Japan
Magazines established in 1964
Magazines published in Tokyo
Monthly manga magazines published in Japan
Shōjo manga magazines
Shueisha magazines